Waldburg-Wurzach was a County and later Principality within Holy Roman Empire, ruled by the House of Waldburg, located on the southeastern border of Baden-Württemberg, Germany, located around Wurzach (located about 15 kilometres west of Bad Waldsee). Waldburg-Wurzach was a partition of Waldburg-Zeil. Waldburg-Wurzach was a county prior to 1803, when it was raised to a principality shortly before being mediatised to Württemberg in 1806.

Rulers of Waldburg-Wurzach

Counts of Waldburg-Wurzach (1674–1803) 
 Sebastian Wunibald (1674–1700)
 Ernest James (1700–34)
 Francis Ernest (1734–81)
 Eberhard I (1781–1803)

Prince of Waldburg-Wurzach (1803–06) 
 Eberhard I (1803–06)

1674 establishments in the Holy Roman Empire